Lloyd George Jackson (May 30, 1918 – October 29, 2011) was the Democratic President of the West Virginia Senate from Lincoln County and served from 1969 to 1971. He was first elected in 1946 and stayed in office until his primary defeat in 1970. Until his death he lived in Hamlin, West Virginia. He was married to Pauline Adkins and they had two children, Lloyd G. Jackson II and Suzanne Jackson. They also had two grandchildren, LG Jackson III (Lloyd) and Ryan Jackson.

References

1918 births
2011 deaths
People from Hamlin, West Virginia
Presidents of the West Virginia State Senate
Democratic Party West Virginia state senators